The 1000 meters distance for women in the 2012–13 ISU Speed Skating World Cup was contested over nine races on six occasions, out of a total of nine World Cup occasions for the season, with the first occasion taking place in Heerenveen, Netherlands, on 16–18 November 2012, and the final occasion also taking place in Heerenveen on 8–10 March 2013.

Heather Richardson of the United States won the cup, while Brittany Bowe, also of the United States, came second, and Karolína Erbanová of the Czech Republic came third. The defending champion, Christine Nesbitt of Canada, came fourth.

Top three

Race medallists

Standings 
Standings as of 10 March 2013 (end of the season).

References 

Women 1000
ISU